Melvin Phillips (born January 6, 1942), is a former American professional football player who played his entire 12-year NFL career with the San Francisco 49ers.

Coaching career
Phillips coached the defensive backs for the Detroit Lions from 1980-1984. He was an assistant coach with the Miami Dolphins from 1985 to 2007. Originally hired by Don Shula, Phillips was retained in order by Jimmy Johnson, Dave Wannstedt, Nick Saban, and Cam Cameron.

1942 births
Living people
American football safeties
North Carolina A&T Aggies football players
San Francisco 49ers players
Detroit Lions coaches
Miami Dolphins coaches
People from Shelby, North Carolina